The Auditor of the Receipt of the Exchequer was an office in the English Exchequer.

The office originated in early times as the clerk of the Lord High Treasurer at the Receipt of the Exchequer. He was responsible for filing and entering the Teller's Bills from the Tellers of the Exchequer, certifying monies received to the Lord Treasurer, and auditing the books of the Tellers. The title of Auditor was officially attached to the post, combined with that of Tally Writer, during the reign of Elizabeth I. In 1826, the duties of the Chamberlains of the Exchequer devolved upon the Auditor. The office was abolished on the 10th of October 1834 along with several other offices of the ancient Exchequer.

Auditors of the Exchequer

Early
Richard Chesterfield c. 1356
Robert Derby c. 1363–1367
Thomas Orgrave 1367–1369
John Innocent 1369–1385
John Nottingham  1385–1390
Robert Cotum 1390–1393
John Candlesby 1393–1399
Henry Somer 1399–1404
John Burgh 1405–1410
William Darell c. 1411–1415
John Iwardeby 1415 – c. 1459
William Hextall ? – 1460
John Poutrell 1 October 1460 – c. 1461
John Iwardeby 4 May 1462 – 1463
John Poutrell 1463–1464
John Leynton  20 October 1464 – 1465
John Croke c. 1467–1469
John Marshall 1469–1471
Thomas Bulkeley 19 October 1471
John Lewes 10 December 1490
Robert Watno 3 May 1514
Thomas Danyell 16 July 1517
John Golding 1520
Thomas Felton 10 May 1550
Humphrey Shelton 8 October 1566
Robert Petre 30 January 1569
Vincent Skinner 11 November 1593 – 1603 (knighted 7 May 1603)
John Bingley 2 August 1604 (knighted 10 January 1618, forfeit 25 January 1620)
Sir Robert Pye 25 January 1620 (knighted 25 June 1620, deprived of office January 1642)
Sir William Roberts 31 August 1654 (lost office 24 June 1660), initially jointly
Sir Thomas Fauconberg 31 August 1654 (died 25 September 1655), jointly

1660-1834
Sir Robert Pye 25 June 1660 (restored)
Sir Robert Long, 1st Baronet 21 May 1662
Sir Robert Howard 14 July 1673
Christopher Montagu 5 April 1698
Charles Montagu, 1st Earl of Halifax 17 November 1699
George Montagu, 1st Earl of Halifax 30 September 1714
Robert Walpole, 2nd Earl of Orford 9 May 1739
Henry Pelham-Clinton, 2nd Duke of Newcastle-under-Lyne 1 April 1751
William Grenville, 1st Baron Grenville 27 February 1794
George Eden, 1st Baron Auckland 14 January 1834
To 10 October 1834.

References
J. C. Sainty (comp.), Officers of the Exchequer (List and Index Society, Special Series 18, 1983), 135–39.

Exchequer offices